Vladimir Aleksandrovich Brazhnikov (11 November 1941 – 7 March 2011) was a Russian professional football coach.

References

External links
 

1941 births
2011 deaths
People from Mozdoksky District
Sportspeople from North Ossetia–Alania
Soviet footballers
Association football defenders
FC Alga Bishkek players
FC Alay players
Soviet football managers
Russian football managers
FC Kuban Krasnodar managers